Venus's looking-glass is a common name for several plant species including:
All members of the genus Triodanis
Legousia speculum-veneris